Mukkur N. Subramanian is an Indian politician and was a member of the 14th Tamil Nadu Legislative Assembly from Cheyyar constituency. He represented the All India Anna Dravida Munnetra Kazhagam (AIADMK) party. He was Minister for Information Technology in the Government of Tamil Nadu.

Subramanian did not obtain support from the AIADMK to stand in the 2016 elections.

References 

Tamil Nadu MLAs 2011–2016
All India Anna Dravida Munnetra Kazhagam politicians
Living people
State cabinet ministers of Tamil Nadu
Year of birth missing (living people)